Daniel Edward Lungren (born September 22, 1946) is an American politician and lawyer who served as the U.S. representative for  from 2005 to 2013. A member of the Republican Party, during his tenure, the district covered most of Sacramento County, portions of Solano County, as well as all of Alpine County, Amador County and Calaveras County.

Lungren previously represented the Long Beach area in Congress from 1979 to 1989 and served as the 29th Attorney General of California from 1991 to 1999. He was the Republican nominee for Governor of California in 1998, losing to Democrat Gray Davis. , he was the last Republican to serve as California Attorney General. In Congress, he was a member of the Republican Study Committee.

Early life, education and private career
Dan Lungren was born in Long Beach, California, of Irish, Swedish and Scottish descent. From 1952, Lungren's father, John, was the personal physician to and a close friend of former President Richard Nixon.

Lungren graduated from St. Anthony High School in 1964 and matriculated to the University of Notre Dame, where he earned an A.B. degree with honors in English in 1968. He returned to California to chair Youth for Nixon during Nixon's first successful run for the presidency.

Lungren began his legal studies at the University of Southern California Law School but transferred to Georgetown University Law Center, where he earned his J.D. degree in 1971. During his years at Georgetown, Lungren worked for U.S. Senators George Murphy (R-California) and Bill Brock (R-Tennessee). From 1971 to 1972, he was Special Assistant to the co-chair of the Republican National Committee (RNC); Lungren's wife, Bobbi, worked in the Nixon White House at the time. When Lungren returned to Long Beach, he joined a law firm and practiced civil law for a short time before running unsuccessfully for Congress in 1976. He was successful in 1978.

U.S. House of Representatives (1979–1989)
Lungren first served in the House of Representatives from 1979 to 1989, representing portions of Long Beach and Orange County. Radley Balko wrote in 2012: "Lungren rose in stature with the election of Ronald Reagan in 1980, and quickly became a darling of the tough-on-crime crowd and the rising moral majority movement." He was one of Newt Gingrich's chief lieutenants during this time; he was a founding member of the Conservative Opportunity Society. He served on the House Judiciary Committee, where he pushed for "tough on crime" legislation. In 1984, Lungren sponsored the Comprehensive Crime Control Act, "at the time one of the most sweeping pieces of anti-crime legislation in U.S. history." In addition, he supported asset forfeiture as a weapon in the War on Drugs, saying he wanted to "[m]ake it illegal for a dry cleaner or a grocery store to take money from a drug dealer (...) and if they do, seize the business. Put the merchant in jail."

Lungren also supported sanctions against employers who hired illegal immigrants, but also favored a temporary guest-worker program. He was the principal House cosponsor of the Simpson-Mazzoli immigration bill, which became the Immigration Reform Act of 1986. He also independently sponsored a "guest worker" bill, designed to allow for importation of "temporary" immigrant laborers.

California statewide offices
Lungren did not seek reelection to the U.S. House when California Governor George Deukmejian appointed him as the state's acting state treasurer, but he was never confirmed.

Lungren was later elected as Attorney General of California in 1990; he served two terms from 1991 to 1999. Shortly after becoming California Attorney General, Lungren, a staunch supporter of capital punishment, presided over California's first execution in over twenty years. During his tenure in the office, he helped pass legislation such as "Megan's Law", "3-Strikes-and-You're-Out", "Sexual Anti-Predator Act" and the "California's Safe Schools Plan". He also sponsored a law allowing minors as young as 14 who are accused of murder to be tried as adults and "led a national effort to limit lawsuits filed by prisoners, which produced the federal Prison Litigation Reform Act of 1996." His 1993 letter to five major video game publishers and seven major video game retailers, asking them "to stop the manufacturing, licensing, distribution, or sale of any video game that portrays graphic and gratuitous violence", was called "the strongest anti-violence statement yet from a top government official" by the gaming press, even with Lungren's accompanying statement that he was strictly making an appeal to the companies' sense of civic responsibility and not calling for any form of government censorship. In 1996, he was considered as a possible vice presidential candidate to run with Republican nominee Bob Dole. That same year, Lungren "vigorously opposed" Proposition 215, which legalized medical marijuana in California.

In 1998 Lungren ran as the Republican candidate for the governorship against Democratic Lieutenant Governor Gray Davis. Davis received 57.9% of the votes, while Lungren got 38.4%. During the campaign, Davis maintained that Lungren, who presented himself as the political heir to former California Governor and U.S. President Ronald Reagan, was too conservative for California. Davis also criticized Lungren's hesitancy, as California Attorney General, to enforce laws restricting assault weapons and his waiting until the last minute to become part of a class action lawsuit against the cigarette industry.

U.S. House of Representatives (2005–2013)
Lungren was elected to California's 3rd congressional district in 2004, which included several rural and exburban areas east of Sacramento. He had moved to Gold River, a Sacramento suburb, in the 1990s.

Lungren was reappointed to the Judiciary Committee based on his previous five terms of seniority; he also served on the Homeland Security Committee. In 2005, Lungren supported the USA PATRIOT Act, which renewed the federal government's ability to perform secret surveillance including wiretaps of citizens and monitoring of public and private computer packet-switched networks to prevent terrorism from hitting the United States. In 2006, Lungren and fellow U.S. Representative Jane Harman authored the SAFE Port Act, which improves security at the ports including additional requirements for maritime facilities, foreign port assessments, container security initiatives and Customs Trade Partnership against Terrorism. The bill passed the House with bipartisan support. Also in 2006, he sponsored the "Streamlined Procedures Act" which "would strip federal courts of the power to review habeas corpus petitions in state death penalty cases." In 2007, Lungren was appointed to the House Administration Committee.

Lungren has stated that he opposes "any bill brought to the floor of the House that includes an amnesty provision that confers citizenship status." He cites his concern as the millions of "legal immigrants who wait years in order to obtain permanent residence and citizenship." Lungren has been an opponent of "the huge growth of spending earmarks." Described as a "maverick", he "cited the need for the party to adopt more fiscally conservative policies."

On July 29, 2008, the House of Representatives passed H.R. 6295, introduced by Lungren. This legislation is to stop the use of submersible and semi-submersible vessels used to transport drugs and other contrabands, which pose a threat to communities and national security. Shortly after the 2008 election, a newly reelected Lungren challenged John Boehner for House Minority Leader. Although Lungren did not win the post, Boehner appointed him as Ranking Member of the House Administration Committee. To serve on this new role, he left his spot with the Budget Committee. He became Chairman of the House Administration Committee when Republicans took control of the House in January 2011. The Cook Political Report by the National Journal named Lungren the Republican most vulnerable to redistricting in 2012.

Lungren lost his reelection bid for California's 7th congressional district, reapportioned after the 2010 United States Census, in the November 2012 election, which was called by the Associated Press on November 15, 2012, in favor of the Democratic challenger, Ami Bera, by a margin of 5,700 votes – 51.1% to 48.9%.

Committee assignments
Committee on House Administration (Chairman)
Committee on the Judiciary
Subcommittee on Crime, Terrorism, and Homeland Security
Subcommittee on Immigration Policy and Enforcement
Task Force on Judicial Impeachment
Committee on Homeland Security
Subcommittee on Transportation Security
Subcommittee on Cybersecurity, Infrastructure Protection, and Security Technologies (Chairman)
Joint Committee on Printing
Joint Committee on the Library
Republican Study Committee

Political campaigns

2004
Lungren ran for Congress again in the 3rd congressional district after six-year incumbent U.S. Representative Doug Ose announced his retirement. Lungren has stated that his desire to serve in Congress again was rekindled by the September 11 attacks. He won a come from behind victory in a three-way primary against Mary Ose and State Senator Rico Oller in 2004.

2010

Lungren was challenged by Democratic nominee Ami Bera, a physician by occupation, American Independent Jerry Leidecker, Peace and Freedom nominee Mike Roskey and Libertarian Douglas Art Tuma. Lungren was reelected with 50.6% of the vote, with Bera accumulating 42.7% and 6.7% to other candidates.

2012

After the 2010 U.S. Census, Lungren's district was renumbered as the 7th district. It lost all of its territory outside Sacramento County and had a more evenly divided registration of Republicans and Democrats than its predecessor. He faced Democrat Ami Bera in the November general election. Seen as a swing district, the race has been described as a potential "PAC Battlefield". One of the most-watched race nationally, both sides poured in millions of dollars for their campaigns. Bera was ultimately elected to the seat.

Electoral history

Personal life
Lungren and his wife Bobbi have three children: Jeff, Kelly and Kathleen. He has seven grandchildren. In 2010 he was inducted into the College of Fellows of the Dominican School of Philosophy and Theology.

References

External links

U.S. Congressman Dan Lungren official U.S. House website
 
The California Citizens Redistricting Commission, final districts 

|-

|-

|-

|-

|-

|-

1946 births
American people of Irish descent
American people of Scottish descent
American people of Swedish descent
California Attorneys General
Georgetown University Law Center alumni
Living people
Republican Party members of the United States House of Representatives from California
People from Long Beach, California
University of Notre Dame alumni
21st-century American politicians
Conservatism in the United States
Members of Congress who became lobbyists